United is a studio album by soul musicians Marvin Gaye and Tammi Terrell, released August 29, 1967 on the Motown-subsidiary label Tamla Records. Harvey Fuqua and Johnny Bristol produced all of the tracks on the album, with the exception of "You Got What It Takes" (produced by Motown CEO Berry Gordy, Jr.) and "Oh How I'd Miss You" (produced by Hal Davis). Fuqua and Bristol produced "Hold Me Oh My Darling" and "Two Can Have a Party" as Tammi Terrell solo tracks in 1965 and 1966, and had Gaye overdub his vocals to them in order to create duet versions of the songs.

United was the duo’s as well as Marvin Gaye’s most successful album of the 1960’s with sales almost reaching one million copies, it yielded four Top 100 Billboard chart hits, including the two Top 10 singles "Your Precious Love," "If I Could Build My Whole World Around You," the Top 20 single, "Ain't No Mountain High Enough" and "If This World Were Mine". United peaked at #69 on the U.S. Billboard 200 album chart and #7 on the U.S. Billboard R&B albums chart upon its release. The album was the first of three collaborative albums by Gaye and Terrell.

Track listing

 "Ain't No Mountain High Enough" (Nickolas Ashford, Valerie Simpson) - 2:32
 "You Got What It Takes" (Berry Gordy, Jr., Gwen Gordy, Tyran Carlo) - 2:59
 "If I Could Build My Whole World Around You" (Harvey Fuqua, Johnny Bristol, Vernon Bullock) - 2:26
 "Somethin' Stupid" (C. Carson Parks) - 2:46
 "Your Precious Love" (Ashford, Simpson) - 3:07
 "Hold Me Oh My Darling" (Harvey Fuqua) - 2:50
 "Two Can Have a Party" (Johnny Bristol, Fuqua, Thomas Kemp) - 2:19
 "Little Ole Boy, Little Ole Girl" (Fuqua, Etta James, Brook Benton) - 2:46
 "If This World Were Mine" (Marvin Gaye) - 2:46
 "Sad Wedding" (Bristol, Jackey Beavers) - 3:27
 "Give a Little Love" (Bristol, Fuqua, Clyde Wilson) - 3:01
 "Oh How I'd Miss You" (Hal Davis, Frank Wilson, Vance Wilson) - 2:37

Chart history
Billboard (North America) – United

Personnel
Lead vocals: Marvin Gaye, Tammi Terrell
Background vocals: Marvin Gaye, Tammi Terrell, Harvey Fuqua, Johnny Bristol, The Originals, The Andantes, The Spinners
Production: Harvey Fuqua, Johnny Bristol, Hal Davis, Berry Gordy, Jr.
Instrumentation: The Funk Brothers (uncredited)

Notes

1967 albums
Marvin Gaye albums
Tammi Terrell albums
Vocal duet albums
Albums produced by Hal Davis
Albums produced by Johnny Bristol
Albums produced by Harvey Fuqua
Albums produced by Berry Gordy
Albums recorded at Hitsville U.S.A.
Tamla Records albums